Yvonne Vermaak (born 18 December 1956) is a former tour tennis player who represented her native South Africa.

Vermaak's best result was reaching the semi-finals of the 1983 Wimbledon Championships, defeating Virginia Wade in the quarter-finals.

In 1977 she won the All England Plate, a competition for players who were defeated in the first three rounds of the Wimbledon singles competition. In the final she defeated Sue Mappin in straight sets.

Late in her playing career, Vermaak became an American citizen.

Vermaak played USTA Master's tennis. Representing Illinois, she was the 1992 Singles Champion of the USTA National Women's Indoor Championships in Homewood for 35s. In 1993, Yvonne Vermaak was the 25s Singles Champion, and again she was the 25s Singles Champion in 1994. In 1995, Vermaak moved to doubles, winning the 25s and 35s doubles with Ann Kiyomura-Hayashi of California. The 1995 Championships was Vermaak's last USTA Championships win.

Career finals

Singles 6 (4–2)

Doubles 7 (4–3)

References

External links
 
 
 USTA Master National Indoor results

Afrikaner people
Living people
South African female tennis players
South African emigrants to the United States
South African people of Dutch descent
Tennis people from Illinois
1956 births
Sportspeople from Port Elizabeth